Eulepidotis regalis is a moth of the family Erebidae described by Arthur Gardiner Butler in 1879. It is found in the neotropics, including Brazil (Pará) and Guyana.

References

Moths described in 1879
regalis